Blond Arrow (Spanish: Saeta rubia)  is a 1956 Spanish film directed by Florián Rey and starring Alfredo Di Stéfano, Antonio Casal and Antonio Ozores. Di Stéfano, one of the stars of the Real Madrid side of the 1950s, appears as himself. The film's title refers to his nickname. It was made by Suevia Films, Spain's leading film studio of the era.

Plot
The film is a biography of Alfredo Di Stéfano who travelled from Argentina to Madrid to try to win fame and fortune as a football player.

References

External links

1950s sports films
Spain in fiction
Spanish association football films
Films directed by Florián Rey
Films produced by Ricardo Sanz
Real Madrid CF
1950s Spanish films
Spanish black-and-white films
1950s Spanish-language films